Subway to the Stars is a 1987 Brazilian drama film directed by Carlos Diegues. It was entered into the 1987 Cannes Film Festival. The film was selected as the Brazilian entry for the Best Foreign Language Film at the 60th Academy Awards, but was not accepted as a nominee.

Cast
 Guilherme Fontes - Vinicius
 Milton Gonçalves - Freitas
 Taumaturgo Ferreira - Dream
 Ana Beatriz Wiltgen - Nicinha
 Zé Trindade - Oliveira
 Míriam Pires - Mrs.Oliveira
 José Wilker - Teacher
 Betty Faria - Camila
 Daniel Filho - Brito
 Tania Boscoli - Bel
 Fausto Fawcett - himself

See also
 List of submissions to the 60th Academy Awards for Best Foreign Language Film
 List of Brazilian submissions for the Academy Award for Best Foreign Language Film

References

External links

1987 drama films
1987 films
1980s Portuguese-language films
Brazilian drama films
Films directed by Carlos Diegues
Films shot in Rio de Janeiro (city)